Albin Małysiak C.M. (12 June 1917 – 16 July 2011) was a Polish bishop of the Roman Catholic Church. At the time of his death, he was one of the oldest Catholic bishops and the oldest Polish bishop.

Biography
Małysiak was born in Kocoń, now Poland, in 1917, and was ordained a priest on 1 May 1941 in the religious institute, the Congregation of the Mission. He was appointed titular bishop of Beatia and auxiliary bishop of the Archdiocese of Kraków on 14 January 1970 and ordained on 5 April 1970. Małysiak remained auxiliary bishop of the diocese until his retirement on 27 February 1993.

References

External links
 Diocese Site 
 Albin Małysiak at Yad Vashem website

1917 births
2011 deaths
People from Żywiec County
Vincentians
Polish Roman Catholic titular bishops
20th-century Roman Catholic bishops in Poland
Vincentian bishops
Polish Righteous Among the Nations
Burials at Salwator Cemetery